The Voices is a 2014 comedy horror film directed by Marjane Satrapi, written by Michael R. Perry, and starring Ryan Reynolds, Gabriel Bateman, Gemma Arterton, Anna Kendrick and Jacki Weaver. It had its world premiere at 2014 Sundance Film Festival on January 19, 2014. The film was released in a limited release and through video on demand on February 6, 2015, by Lionsgate. It received generally positive reviews from critics, with many highlighting Reynolds’ performance.

Plot
Jerry Hickfang struggles with schizophrenia, working at a plumbing fixtures factory and living above a bowling alley. He lies to his court-appointed therapist, Dr. Warren, concealing his hallucinations of his pets -- his good-natured dog, Bosco, and his antisocial cat, Mr. Whiskers -- talking to him.

Jerry invites his coworker Fiona to a Chinese dinner theater, but she stands him up to karaoke with her colleagues Lisa and Alison. When Fiona's car fails to start, she flags down Jerry as he drives by, and a deer crashes through his windshield. Hallucinating the deer begging him to put it out of its misery, Jerry cuts its throat with a hunting knife. Terrified, Fiona runs into the woods, and Jerry trips and accidentally stabs her. Tearfully declaring that he loves her, he repeatedly stabs her while apologizing.

At home, Bosco suggests Jerry go to the police, but Mr. Whiskers says he should be unashamed of killing. Jerry collects Fiona's body, leaving several organs behind, and admits to Dr. Warren that he no longer takes his medication. He dismembers Fiona, storing her remains in numerous Tupperware containers, and her severed head begins talking to him, demanding he take his medication. Jerry does so, experiencing nightmares of his abusive father, and wakes up to find his hallucinations have ended: his pets and Fiona's decaying head no longer speak, and his apartment is covered in garbage, animal waste, and blood.

Jerry throws away his pills, prompting his hallucinations to return his life to 'normal', and Fiona urges him to kill again to provide her with "a friend". He asks Lisa on a date, taking her to his abandoned childhood home to kill her, but is overwhelmed by the memory of his mother's death: she was also schizophrenic, and when the authorities arrived to have her committed, she forced Jerry to slit her throat, leading him to be institutionalized instead. Comforting Jerry, Lisa kisses him, and he leaves his knife behind as she brings him home to spend the night together.

Fiona's remains are discovered in the woods, and she and the pets confront Jerry over his urges to kill and the fact that their voices are only in his head. Lisa surprises Jerry at home, discovering the horrifying state of his apartment and Fiona's head. He struggles to explain himself as she tries to escape, and throws her onto the bed, breaking her neck. Curling up with Lisa as she lays dying, Jerry dismembers her and places her head in the fridge beside Fiona's.

When Jerry's coworkers realize Lisa is missing and find an article about his mother's death, Alison goes to his apartment. Jerry kills her, keeping her head with the others, but becomes overwhelmed by the voices. He confesses his killings to Dr. Warren before kidnapping her to the countryside, desperate for her help. She reassures him about managing her own intrusive thoughts, while Jerry's coworkers break into his apartment and call the police.

Jerry returns home with a captive Dr. Warren, and police surround the building. Climbing down a vent into the bowling alley, Jerry accidentally breaks a gas pipe, and Dr. Warren is rescued just before the gas leak causes an explosion. In the burning bowling alley, the voice of Mr. Whiskers urges Jerry to escape and continue killing, but the voice of Bosco tells him that life no longer has a place for him, and Jerry succumbs to smoke inhalation.

In a white void, Mr. Whiskers and Bosco confess that, despite their opposing beliefs, they did like each other, before Jerry appears with his parents, Fiona, Lisa, and Alison. Jerry apologizes to his victims as Jesus appears, and they all dance and sing a musical number together.

Cast

Production
Before initial production, the script for The Voices received critical praise, including being listed on The Black List's Best UN-produced Screenplays of 2009. The film originally had Mark Romanek attached to direct in 2010, with Ben Stiller attached to star, but was never made due to budget issues. The project was brought up again in August 2012, when it was announced that Marjane Satrapi would be directing. When asked about having Reynolds perform all the voices Jerry hears in his head, Satrapi stated in an interview with Digital Spy, "At the beginning, the producer and myself said let's look for an actor, and then Ryan made the voices on his iPhone and he sent it over, and I was like, "Who is that?" And suddenly it makes sense. That is the voices the guy hears, so who else but him can do it? It can only be him, so, yeah, it was an obvious choice."

Principal photography began in April 2013 in Berlin, Germany.

Release
The film had its world premiere at the Sundance Film Festival on January 19, 2014. On March 5, 2014, it was announced Lionsgate had acquired distribution rights to the film. The film screened at the Toronto International Film Festival on September 11, 2014. The film was then released on video on demand and in limited release on February 6, 2015. In its opening weekend, the film made $5,000.

Critical reception

On Rotten Tomatoes, the film has an approval rating of 75% based on 99 reviews, with an average rating of 6.5/10. The website's critical consensus reads, "The Voices gives Ryan Reynolds an opportunity to deliver a highlight-reel performance—and offers an off-kilter treat for fans of black comedies." On Metacritic, the film has a weighted average score of 58 out of 100, based on 24 critics, indicating "mixed or average reviews".

Brad Wheeler of Canada's The Globe and Mail gave the film three out of four stars and stated, "Think of this stylish, quirky and quite grisly feature from Marjane Satrapi as a meeting of Psycho, Dexter and Dr. Dolittle."

Reynolds liked the film and felt it was underrated, saying it was "One of my favorite movies I've ever done. Never really got its day in court, but man, it's weird and fun and beautiful."

Awards and nominations

 20th annual L'Etrange Festival in Paris bestowed two awards on the film: the Canal+ Nouveau Genre Award (the festival's Grand Prize) and the equally prestigious Audience Award.  
 2015 Festival International du Film Fantastique de Gérardmer granted two more honors to the film: the Audience Award and the Jury Award.

See also
 Blood List

References

External links
 
 
 

2014 films
2014 comedy horror films
2010s crime thriller films
2014 horror films
2014 black comedy films
American black comedy films
American comedy thriller films
American crime thriller films
American comedy horror films
German black comedy films
German comedy thriller films
English-language German films
Films directed by Marjane Satrapi
Films set in 2013
Films shot in Berlin
Films shot in Germany
American serial killer films
Matricide in fiction
Films about suicide
Babelsberg Studio films
Mandalay Pictures films
Lionsgate films
Vertigo Entertainment films
2014 independent films
Films produced by Roy Lee
2014 comedy films
2010s English-language films
2010s American films
2010s German films